Slovenia competed in the Eurovision Song Contest 1999, represented by Darja Švajger and "For a Thousand Years". The song, performed in Slovene as "Se tisoc let", was the winner of the Slovene national final, EMA 1999. Švajger had previously represented Slovenia in 1995 with "Prisluhni mi"

Before Eurovision

EMA 1999 
EMA 1999 was the 5th edition of the Slovenian national final format Evrovizijska Melodija (EMA). The competition was used by RTV Slovenija to select Slovenia's entry for the Eurovision Song Contest 1999.

Final 
EMA 1999 took place on 26 February 1999 at the RTV Slovenija studios in Ljubljana, hosted by Mojca Mavec. The combination of points from a public vote (1/3) and a four-member jury panel (2/3) determined the winner selected "Še tisoč let" performed by Darja Švajger as the winner. The jury consisted of Miša Molk, Mojmir Sepe, Andrej Karoli and Marc Roberts. The winner of the public vote was "Zakaj" performed by Tinkara Kovač, however she only came second overall. Kovač would later go on to represent Slovenia in Eurovision 2014.

At Eurovision
On the night of Eurovision, held on 29 May in Jerusalem, Švajger performed "Se tisoc let" in English as "For a Thousand Years". Švajger performed sixth on the night of the contest, following the United Kingdom and preceding Turkey. She received 50 points (12 points from Croatia and Ireland), placing 11th in a field of 23.

Due to a low average score over the past 5 contests, Slovenia were forced to sit out the 2000 Contest. Slovenia would return to Eurovision in 2001.

Voting

References

External links
Slovene National Final 1999

1999
Countries in the Eurovision Song Contest 1999
Eurovision